Orania bimucronata is a species of sea snail, a marine gastropod mollusk in the family Muricidae, the murex snails or rock snails.

Description

Distribution
This marine species occurs off the Philippines.

References

 Lozouet, P. & Plaziat, J.-C., 2008 Mangrove environments and molluscs, Abatan river, Bohol and Panglao islands, central Philippines,, p. 1-160, 38 pls

External links
 Reeve, L. A. (1846-1847). Monograph of the genus Buccinum. In: Conchologia Iconica, or, illustrations of the shells of molluscous animals, vol. 3, pl. 1-14 and unpaginated text. L. Reeve & Co., London
 Gbif.com: Orania bimucronata; retrieved: 14 August 2012
 Sealifebase.org: Orania bimucronata; retrieved: 14 August 2012

Gastropods described in 1846
Orania (gastropod)